Frank Vaughan (1918–2014) was a Catholic priest of the Diocese of Broken Bay and a New South Wales Rugby League player. He played for Eastern Suburbs in 1939. He was Parish Priest of Our Lady, Queen of Peace Parish in Normanhurst.

Rugby League

Vaughan played two games for the Sydney Roosters, then called Eastern Suburbs. During this time he scored one try and one goal against North Sydney in a 22-18 match played on 24 July 1939. During the 1939 season, Eastern Suburbs finished fifth out of the eight teams, and did not qualify for the finals.

The Catholic Church

Vaughan became a seminarian for the Archdiocese of Sydney in 1940, and was ordained a priest in 1947.  He served in the Parishes of Bankstown, Brighton Le Sands, Sutherland, Lithgow, North Leichhardt, Lidcombe, Campsie, Harris Park, Blackheath, Woy Woy, and Normanhurst. He was the first Parish Priest of Normanhurst; the Parish was established in 1971.

See also
Rugby

References

Australian rugby league players
Sydney Roosters players
1918 births
2014 deaths
Australian Roman Catholic priests
Place of birth missing